Broadwoodwidger was a rural district in the administrative county of Devon from 1894 to 1966, northeast of Launceston.  The district consisted of part of the Launceston rural sanitary district in Devon. The remainder of the sanitary district became Launceston Rural District in Cornwall.

The rural district comprised six civil parishes:
 Broadwoodwidger
 Northcott
 North Petherwin
 St Giles on the Heath
 Virginstow
 Werrington

Part of the rural district lay west of the River Tamar, forming a salient surrounded by Cornwall on three sides. The county boundary was realigned when the district was abolished in 1966, with two parishes, North Petherwin and the majority of Werrington being transferred to Cornwall with the remaining four parishes remaining in Devon and passing to the Holsworthy Rural District.

References
https://web.archive.org/web/20070930230555/http://www.visionofbritain.org.uk/relationships.jsp?u_id=10061817&c_id=10001043

History of Devon
Districts of England created by the Local Government Act 1894
Rural districts of England